Robert Jones Atkinson was a Democratic politician from the state of Ohio, United States. He was President of the Ohio Senate in 1854, and was an appointed official in the United States Department of the Treasury 1854 to 1864.

Biography
Robert Jones Atkinson was born in Carrollton, Ohio in 1820 to Isaac and Hester (Jones) Atkinson. He began as a clerk in Carrollton. He was elected to the Ohio State Senate to serve a term starting in 1852. The legislature met for a session in 1852 and another in 1853. He was re-elected, and served in the 1854 session. On January 2, 1854, the Senate elected Atkinson as President pro tem over Wiliam Lawrence by vote of 22 to 7. The Senate adjourned May 1, 1854.

Federal service
In 1854, Atkinson was appointed Third Auditor of the United States Treasury. He 
assumed office August 28, 1854 and was not replaced until July 18, 1864. In 1866, Atkinson was appointed attorney and counselor to the United States Supreme Court. He died in Washington in 1871.

Personal
Robert Atkinson married Matilda Jackson of Carrollton, Ohio. They had three sons and three daughters. Two sons were bankers in Montana, and the other worked at the United States Treasury. Robert and Matilda Atkinson are buried at Grandview Cemetery in Carrollton, Ohio. He was a Democrat, a Freemason and a Presbyterian.

Notes

References

1820 births
1871 deaths
People from Carrollton, Ohio
Presidents of the Ohio State Senate
Democratic Party Ohio state senators
19th-century American politicians